A barbershop quartet is a group of four singers who sing music in the barbershop style, characterized by four-part harmony without instrumental accompaniment, or a cappella. The four voices are: the lead, the vocal part which typically carries the melody; a bass, the part which provides the bass line to the melody; a tenor, the part which harmonizes above the lead; and a baritone, the part that frequently completes the chord. The baritone normally sings just below the lead singer, sometimes just above as the harmony requires. Barbershop music is typified by close harmony— the upper three voices generally remain within one octave of each other.

While the traditional barbershop quartet included only male singers, contemporary quartets can include any gender combination. All-female barbershop quartets were often called beauty shop quartets, a term that has fallen out of favor. The voice parts for women's and mixed barbershop groups use the same names as those for male groups since the roles perform similar functions in the quartet although the vocal ranges may be different.

While the regional origins of barbershop quartet singing are not wholly agreed upon, current organizations that promote the style typify it as an "old American institution." While the style is most popular in the United States, barbershop organizations exist in the United Kingdom, The Netherlands, Germany, Ireland, South Africa, Finland, Sweden, New Zealand, Australia, and Canada.

Barbershop quartets have been featured in popular culture in musical theater productions such as The Music Man, or lampooned in television series such as The Simpsons and Family Guy.

History 

While many sources claim that barbershop singing originated in the late 19th and early 20th centuries in the United States of America, some maintain that the origins of barbershop singing are "obscure".  The style is considered a blend of White and African American musical styles. Although the African American influence is sometimes overlooked, these quartets had a formative role in the development of the style.

By the 1920s, the popularity of the style had begun to fade.  It was revived in the late 1930s along with the founding of the Society for the Preservation and Encouragement of Barber Shop Quartet Singing in America (SPEBSQSA), now known as the Barbershop Harmony Society, or BHS. The society's first meeting was held at the Tulsa Club in Tulsa, Oklahoma, on April 11, 1938, and it was open only to male singers. In 1945, a parallel organization for women was also founded in Tulsa, called Sweet Adelines International (SAI). Harmony, Incorporated (HI), also serving women, was established in Rhode Island in 1959.

In 1971, president of BHS Ralph Ribble launched the "Barberpole Cat Program" to encourage barbershop singing as widely as possible.  Well-known and popular barbershop songs were published and promoted in order to provide a core set of pieces for barbershop quartets.  The current list of 12 songs, commonly known as "polecats", was selected in 1987. These songs, plus the tag end of two others, are:

Style of dress 

In competition, barbershop quartets generally wear coordinated outfits to mark them as members of the same group. A group's visual impression is rated as part of the "showmanship" score. The Society Contest and Judging Committee of the Barbershop Harmony Society notes in their rule book that aesthetics are important to competitive success: "The judge responds to both the vocal and visual aspects of the performance, but the judge principally evaluates the interaction of those aspects as they work together to create the image of the song."

Traditionally, barbershop quartet attire consisted of: vest, straw hat, and spats, often with bow tie and sleeve garters; this is known as the Gay Nineties style. In popular culture, this style exemplifies the stereotypical barbershop quartet. Several Walt Disney theme parks feature a dedicated barbershop quartet called The Dapper Dans (Disney World version pictured). The outfits worn by these performers vary depending on location but do feature vests and straw hats.

Roles of vocal parts 
As a general rule, barbershop quartets use a TTBB (tenor—tenor—baritone—bass) arrangement, with the second tenor singing the lead. Since the 1940s, barbershop singers have tuned their seventh chords with just intonation to maximize the overtones, yielding a distinctive "ringing" sound. 

Tenor: The tenor generally harmonizes above the lead, making the part the highest in the quartet. So as not to overpower the lead singer, who carries the tune, the part is often sung in falsetto, which is of a softer quality than singing in the modal register, though some quartets do make use of tenors with a softer full voice quality. Notable examples of barbershop quartets which made use of the full-voiced tenor include The Buffalo Bills and Boston Common.

The range of a tenor in barbershop music does not necessarily closely correspond to that of a tenor's range in Classical repertoire, often being more in the range of the classical countertenor range.

Lead: The lead, often a lower or second tenor or even more recently a higher or lighter baritone, usually sings the main melody.

Baritone: The baritone often completes the chord with a medium voice, usually slightly below the lead, but sometimes above it.

Bass: The bass always sings and harmonizes the lowest notes, often setting the root of the chord for root position chords, or singing the lowest note of the chord for inverted chords.

In popular culture 
The TV sitcom I Love Lucy used the cast in a barbershop quartet in the 1952 episode, "Lucy's Show-Biz Swan Song;" the same footage was used for a dream sequence in their 1956 Christmas show.
In the 1957 Meredith Willson Broadway musical The Music Man, the Barbershop Harmony Society International Quartet Contest Champions The Buffalo Bills (Vern Reed, Al Shea, Wayne "Scotty" Ward, Bill Spangenberg) were such a hit that they were cast in the 1962 film adaptation starring Robert Preston as Harold Hill and Shirley Jones as Marian Paroo.
Cheers featured a barbershop quartet in the season 4 episode, "Dark Imaginings" (1986) and in the season 8 episode, "The Stork Brings a Crane" (1989).
A 1993 episode of The Simpsons, "Homer's Barbershop Quartet", parodied the journey of The Beatles as though they were each members of a barbershop quartet named "The Be Sharps". The episode starred The Dapper Dans, a quartet who sing on Main Street in Disneyland in California.
In the 1997 Friends episode titled "The One with All The Jealousy", Dr. Ross Geller hires a barbershop quartet and sends it to Rachel's office to sing her a love song.
Frasier featured a barbershop quartet in the episode, "Frasier's Curse" (1998).
In every episode of Nick Jr.'s television program Blue's Clues (1996–2006), a barbershop quartet can be heard saying "Mailtime", after which Steve (portrayed by Steve Burns) or Joe (portrayed by Donovan Patton) sings the mail time song before the mail arrives at their house.
Psychs fourth season's seventh episode of, "High Top Fade-Out", prominently features the murder of a member of Gus' college barbershop quartet. Originally called "Blackapella", the quartet is renamed "Quarterblack" once Shawn (a white man) joins.
The internet webcomic Homestuck (2009–2016) features a barbershop cover of the Eddie Morton song, "I'm a Member of the Midnight Crew." The cover was sung by a fan of the series and was put into the comic on the page, "DD: Ascend more casually."
The 2017 video game Cuphead, known for its 1900s cartoon style, contains two songs sung by barbershop quartet "'Shoptimus Prime": "Don't Deal with the Devil" and "A Quick Break".
An animatronic barbershop quartet is one of the scenery pieces in the theme park video game Planet Coaster. It is part of the Vintage Pack, a DLC pack that focuses on classic rides and theming.
In a 2019 GEICO television commercial, a barbershop quartet sings while playing a four-on-four basketball game.
The Ben Show (2013) has a recurring sketch in which a barbershop quartet sings the titles of porn videos.
Barbershop music is featured extensively in the 1975 post-apocalyptic film A Boy and His Dog.
Sesame Street has a barbershop quartet of Muppets who imitate the genre with the songs, "When You Cooperate", "Long Time No See", "Small B", "Same Different Barbershop Quartet", and "Counting Floors", among others.
Jack's  Big Music Show episodes frequently featured the "Schwartzman Quartet," a quartet of four puppet brothers; with one of their appearances explaining barbershop music.

See also 

Barbershop music
Barbershop chorus
Barbershop Harmony Society
Gospel quartet
List of Barbershop Harmony Society quartet champions
Sweet Adelines International competition

References

External links 
 

Barbershop music
A cappella
Four-part harmony